Orange is an unincorporated community in Clark County, Illinois, United States. Orange is located in south central Clark County west of West Union.

References

Unincorporated communities in Clark County, Illinois
Unincorporated communities in Illinois